Miyagi 1st district is a single-member constituency of the House of Representatives, the lower house of the National Diet of Japan. It is located on the island of Honshu, in Miyagi Prefecture. It, along with Miyagi 2nd district and parts of districts 3 and 4, cover the city of Sendai and the surrounding suburbs. 

As of 2020, the district was home to 437,128 constituents.

The district is represented by Toru Doi of the Liberal Democratic Party.

Areas Covered

Current District 
After rezoning in 2022, the district covers the following areas:

 Sendai
 Aoba-ku
 Taihaku-ku

As a result of the rezoning, the district has returned to the state it was in before 2017

Areas from 2017-2022 
From 2017 to 2022, the district covered the following areas:

 Sendai
 Aoba-ku
 Taihaku-ku (Exluding the former town of Akiu)

As a result of the 2017 rezoning the area of the former town of Akiu was moved into the 3rd district.

Areas from Pre-2017 
From its creating in 1994 until redistricting in 2017, the district covered the following areas:

 Sendai
 Aoba-ku
 Taihaku-ku

Elected Representatives

Election Results 
‡ - Also ran in the Tohoku proportional representation block

‡‡ - Ran and won a seat in the Tohoku proportional representation block

References

Related 

Elections in Japan